Lucecito may refer to:

, a 1992–1993 Colombian remake of Lucecita (1967)
Lucecito, name under which Lucero (entertainer) made her first records

See also
 Lucecita (disambiguation)